Jarius Holmes (born March 26, 1986 in Japan) is an American soccer player, currently playing for St. Louis Lions in the USL Premier Development League.

Career

Youth and amateur
Holmes grew up in Shiloh, Illinois, attended O'Fallon Township High School, and played college soccer at McKendree University and at Southwestern Illinois College. While at McKendree, he was two-time All-Conference selection and was named American Midwest Conference Newcomer of the Year in 2006. He was the first McKendree University player to sign a professional outdoor soccer contract.

During his college years, Holmes also played with the St. Louis Lions in the USL Premier Development League, and with local St. Louis amateur club, Fortels (FSC).

Professional
Holmes joined the USL First Division expansion franchise Austin Aztex in 2009. He made his professional debut on April 18, 2009, in Austin's USL1 season opener against Minnesota Thunder.

He was released by the Aztex at the end of the 2009 season., and re-signed for the St. Louis Lions in 2010.

References

External links
 Austin Aztex bio

1986 births
Living people
American soccer players
Austin Aztex FC players
St. Louis Lions players
USL League Two players
USL First Division players
Association football midfielders